Tri Pointe Homes, Inc. is a home construction company headquartered in Incline Village, Nevada. It also offers financing and insurance services to homebuyers. It operates in Arizona, California, Nevada, Washington, Colorado, Texas, the District of Columbia, Maryland, North Carolina, South Carolina, and Virginia. The company is the 18th largest home construction company in the United States based on the number of homes closed.

History
Tri Pointe was founded in April 2009 in Irvine, California by Doug Bauer, Tom Mitchell, and Mike Grubbs. In 2010, it received $150 million in financing from Starwood Capital.

In January 2013, Tri Pointe became a public company via an initial public offering.

In July 2014, Tri Pointe acquired Weyerhaeuser Real Estate Company (WRECO), which constructed homes under the names Quadrant Homes (greater Seattle and Puget Sound area), Pardee Homes (California and Nevada), Maracay Homes (Arizona), Trendmaker Homes, Avanti Custom Homes, Texas Casual Cottages (Texas), Winchester Homes, Camberley Homes, and Everson Homes (Maryland and Virginia).

In January 2021, the company changed its corporate name and rebranded all of its subsidiaries under the name Tri Pointe Homes.

Awards and recognition
TRI Pointe Group was named 2019 Builder of the Year by Builder and Developer magazine, recognized in Fortune magazine's 2017 100 Fastest-Growing Companies list, and garnered the 2015 Builder of the Year Award by Builder magazine.

References

External links
 

2009 establishments in California
American companies established in 2009
Companies based in Nevada
Companies listed on the New York Stock Exchange
Construction and civil engineering companies of the United States
Home builders
Organizations based in Irvine, California
Real estate companies established in 2009